The Yanigua Formation is a geologic formation in Dominican Republic. The lagoonal claystones and marls preserve fossils dating back to the Miocene period. The formation hosts Dominican amber.

Fossil content 

 Aureofungus yaniguaensis, named after the formation
 Cephalotes alveolatus, C. caribicus, C. dieteri, C. hispaniolicus
 Enischnomyia stegosoma
 Mesembrinella caenozoica
 Vetufebrus ovatus
 ?Neocallichirus quisquellanus
 Portunus sp.

See also 
 List of fossiliferous stratigraphic units in the Dominican Republic
 La Toca Formation
 El Mamey Formation
 Lagunitas Formation, Cuba

References

Further reading 
 C. E. Schweitzer, M. Iturralde Vinent, J. L. Hetler and J. Vélez Juarbe. 2006. Oligocene and Miocene decapods (Thalassinidea and Brachyura) from the Caribbean. Annals of Carnegie Museum 75(2):111-136

Geologic formations of the Dominican Republic
Neogene Dominican Republic
Paleontology in the Dominican Republic
Marl formations
Lagoonal deposits
Formations